The 1933 VPI Gobblers football team represented Virginia Agricultural and Mechanical College and Polytechnic Institute , now known as  Virginia Tech the 1933 college football season.  The team was led by their head coach Henry Redd and finished with a record of four wins, three losses and three ties (4–3–3).

Schedule

Players

Roster

Varsity letter winners
Eighteen players received varsity letters for their participation on the 1933 VPI team.

Season summary

at Alabama

Source:

Against the Crimson Tide of the University of Alabama, VPI lost 27-0 in front 10,000 spectators at Denny Stadium.  Alabama took a 6–0 first quarter lead after Riley Smith scored on a five-yard touchdown run.  They extended their lead to 18–0 at halftime on touchdown runs of one-yard by Joe Demyanovich and ten-yards by James Angelich in the second quarter.  Alabama then closed the game with a 16-yard Dixie Howell touchdown run and a tackle of the Gobblers' Ray Mills for a safety in the third for the 27–0 win.

Alabama's assistant coach was former VPI player Hank Crisp.

References

VPI
Virginia Tech Hokies football seasons
VPI Gobblers